Beambridge can refer to the following English places: 

 Beambridge, Shropshire
 Beambridge, Cheshire, a village in Worleston

Other meanings
 Beam bridge, a type of bridge
 Bembridge, a village of the Isle of Wight
 Bembridge (surname)